Carloalberto Giordani (born 24 October 1997) is an Italian professional racing cyclist, who currently rides for UCI Continental team . He rode in the men's individual pursuit event at the 2017 UCI Track Cycling World Championships.

References

External links
 

1997 births
Living people
Italian male cyclists
Place of birth missing (living people)
Cyclists at the 2019 European Games
European Games medalists in cycling
European Games silver medalists for Italy
Italian track cyclists
Cyclists from the Province of Verona